"Baby" is a song by English singer and songwriter Charli XCX, released on 1 March 2022. It was released as the fourth single from her fifth studio album Crash (2022). The track is an '80s-inspired post-disco, dance-pop, and funk-pop track with new jack swing and electro-funk elements. It has received positive reviews for its catchiness and sultry production.

Background and release 
In an interview with Apple Music, Charli revealed that this track was one of the first ones to be conceptualized for the album. She further stated "I was working on it with Justin Raisen, and we’d done a lot together for my first ever album, True Romance. So it kind of felt cyclical to go back and with him again on what is my final record in my deal with Atlantic."

Charli revealed that this track will be included on her fifth studio album Crash on November 4, 2021, by playing a snippet of the song on a TikTok live. On December 19, 2021, following the cancellation of her SNL appearance due to the rise of Omicron variant cases in New York, Charli shared another snippet of the song, showing herself dancing to the song with choreographers. The single was registered on SongFile on December 25, 2021, with Justin Raisen and SadPony credited as the producers. She uploaded a snippet of the track with the caption "i'm thinking this next..." on February 1, 2022, following the release of Crash'''s third single "Beg for You".

 Music and concept 
"Baby", much like "Good Ones" and "New Shapes", showcases a more mainstream sound than the singer's previous releases. It "leans further into the record's overall '80s disco vibes with sparkling synths and funky guitar riffs". The disco-fied tune, inspired by the New jack swing elements of Janet Jackson's seminal album Control'' as well as the electro-funk of Cameo, was created in partnership with Justin and Jeremiah Raisen (a.k.a. Sad Pony), the latter of who have done a lot of work with Yves Tumor, Angel Olsen, Kim Gordon, and many others.

She explained in an interview with Apple Music that "obviously so much has changed, and this song, it was kind of the foundation of the vibe of the album. It's probably the most sexy song I've ever made. It's about sex and sexuality and having good sex and just feeling yourself essentially. I know that that's the tone. I knew that that was the tone I wanted to carry across for the entire record. This kind of hyper-sexualized, feminine power zone was where I was feeling myself going, and 'Baby' was the genesis of this."

Rankings

Music video 
Along with the song, a music video directed by Imogene Strauss and Luke Orlando was released on March 2, 2022. Nathan Kim devised a dance routine for the video. In the video, Charli runs through sensual choreography while flanked by a pair of look-alike backup dancers. She explained that she "wanted to challenge myself on the choreo for this song, which was really, really tough and I have so much respect for dancers, professional dancers, anyone who communicates emotion through dance. It is so hard and challenging, but so rewarding."

Release history

References

2022 songs
2022 singles
Charli XCX songs
Songs written by Charli XCX
Post-disco songs
Funk songs